Plush is a 2013 American erotic thriller film directed by Catherine Hardwicke and co-written by Arty Nelson with music by Nick Launay and Ming Vauze. The film stars Emily Browning, Xavier Samuel, Cam Gigandet, Dawn Olivieri, Thomas Dekker, and Frances Fisher.

Plot
After losing her bandmate and brother to a drug overdose, rising rock star Hayley finds herself in a downward spiral. The second album from her band Plush is received as a critical and commercial disaster. She finds new hope and friendship in Enzo, the replacement guitarist who inspires her to reach new creative heights. However, soon their collaboration crosses the line sexually and Hayley, who is married with two children, retreats from Enzo's advances. As Hayley slowly discovers Enzo's dark and troubled history, she realizes she may have let a madman into her home and that her mistake may cost the lives of people closest to her.

Cast 
 Emily Browning as Hayley
 Xavier Samuel as Enzo
 Cam Gigandet as Carter
 Dawn Olivieri as Annie
 Thomas Dekker as Jack
 Frances Fisher as Camila
 Elizabeth Peña as Dr. Lopez
 Brandon Jay McLaren as Butch Hopkins/Writer
 Marlene Forte as Dr. Ortiz
 Bradley Metcalf, Jack Metcalf, and Travis Metcalf as The Twins
 Kennedy Waite as Lila
 Steven Asbury as Donnie/Drummer
 Marcus AK Andersson as Diego/Bass Player
 James Kyson as Coat & Tie Fan
 Indira G. Wilson as Limo Driver
 Caitlin Bray as Enzo's Sister

Production 
In 2012 Hardwicke announced her intentions to film Plush based on a script she wrote with Artie Nelson. IM Global was named as the financier for the film, which would star Emily Browning as the lead character. Principal photography began on August 27, 2012 in Los Angeles.

Teaser photos and posters were released on to the official website in August 2013.

Novel
Plush: A Novel by Kate Crash, was a 2013 novel. 
The tie-in novel based upon the film was released on July 27, 2013. The book, which is also entitled Plush, was written by Kate Crash, who also contributed several songs to Plush's soundtrack. The novel tells the story of the film and the nine years prior to the start of the film.

Soundtrack
Plush: The Movie: Original Motion Picture Soundtrack, was a 2013 album.
The score and soundtrack were produced by alternative post-punk producer Nick Launay and singer-songwriter Ming Vauz (Sleepmask). The soundtrack, initially conceived as a dramatic force for pushing the film's plot, featured music written and performed by Gary Numan (uncredited), Julian Shah-Tayler, Storm Large, Kate Crash, Anomie Belle, and Devix Szell. Leading actors Xavier Samuel, Emily Browning, and Thomas Dekker supplied vocal performances for their respective tracks.

Reception
Critical reception for Plush has been predominantly negative. , the film holds a 33% approval rating on Rotten Tomatoes, based upon six reviews with an average rating of 4.12/10. Christy Lemire gave the film a half a star, criticizing it as "inauthentic at every turn". In contrast IndieWire gave the film a "B+", commenting that although Plush wasn't "high art", it did "commit fully and follow through with the courage of its convictions".

References

External links 

 

Films set in Los Angeles
Films shot in Los Angeles
Films directed by Catherine Hardwicke
IM Global films
2010s erotic thriller films
2010s romantic thriller films
Erotic romance films
American erotic thriller films
American independent films
2013 films
Blumhouse Productions films
Films produced by Jason Blum
American romantic thriller films
2010s English-language films
2010s American films